This is a list of surviving North American P-51 Mustangs, including airworthy planes and planes on display.

Survivors

Australia
Airworthy
CA-18 Mustang 21
A68-104 - Robbie Eastgate, formerly owned by Bob Eastgate (d.2020) at Melbourne, Victoria; one of Australia's oldest operating warbirds, registered as VH-BOB, underwent a 15-year restoration, taking to the air again on 26 January 2023. 
A68-105 (painted as Mustang IV KH677/CV-P) – Judy Pay and Richard Hourigan at Tyabb, Victoria.
A68-107 – Pay's Air Service in Scone, New South Wales
A68-110 (painted as P-51D A68-769) – Caboolture Warplane Museum in Caboolture, Queensland.
A68-118 – Jeff Trappett in Morwell, Victoria.
CA-18 Mustang 23

A68-107 – "Duffy's Delight" with the Air Force Heritage Squadron, RAAF Base Point Cook.
CA-18 Mustang 22
A68-199 – Peter Gill Tyabb, Victoria. Sold to Aerial Speed Icons Shellharbour Airport, New South Wales. 
P-51D
45-11526 – VH-FST "The Flying Undertaker"  Wylie Aviation in Perth, Western Australia. 
Since 2016 owned by Bishopp Aviation, Queensland.

On display
P-51D
A68-648 (44-13106) – Australian War Memorial in Canberra.
Under restoration
CA-17 Mustang 20
A68-71 – Australian National Aviation Museum at Moorabbin, Victoria.
P-51D
A68-750 (44-84489) – Peter N. Anderson in Sydney.

Austria
Airworthy
P-51D
44-74427 Nooky Booky IV - based at The Flying Bulls in Salzburg

Belgium
44-72826 Scat VI – former plane of Brigadier General Robin Olds, was privately owned in Tuscaloosa, Alabama where it crashed.
It was subsequently restored and is now flying in Belgium, privately owned.

Canada
Airworthy
P-51D
44-73210 – CanAm Investments in The Pas, Manitoba.
44-73463 – Michael Potter in Ottawa.
44-63350 – Terry Dieno, Davidson, Saskatchewan 
On display
P-51D
44-73347 – Canada Aviation and Space Museum in Rockcliffe, Ontario.

China
On display
P-51D
44-73920 – Military Museum of the Chinese People's Revolution in Beijing.
P-51K
44-12458 – People's Liberation Army Air Force Museum in Changping.

Czech Republic
Airworthy
P-51D
45-11540 Excalibur – sold by Jim Read to a private Czech owner.

Dominican Republic
On display
P-51D
44-72123 – San Isidro Air Force Base in Santo Domingo.

France
On display
P-51D
44-63871 – Musee de l'Air in Paris.

Germany
Airworthy
P-51D
44-72773 Lucky Lady VII (D-FPSI) – Christoph Nöthinger in Eschbach, Bremgarten Airfield (EDTG).
44-72811 – Stefan Bungarten at Eschbach, Bremgarten Airfield (EDTG).
44-73871 – Max Alpha Aviation in Eschbach, Bremgarten Airfield (EDTG).

Indonesia

On display
P-51D
44-84801 / F-338 – Halim Perdanakusuma International Airport, East Jakarta, Jakarta.

P-51K
44-12752 / F-303 – The Indonesian Air Force HQ, East Jakarta, Jakarta.

Cavalier Mustang II
44-74229 / F-362 – The Indonesian Air Force HQ, East Jakarta, Jakarta.
Unknown / F-347 – Satriamandala Museum, South Jakarta, Jakarta.
Unknown / F-354 – Museum Palagan Ambarawa, Semarang Regency, Central Java. Painted in ML-KNIL livery.
Unknown / F-361 – Dirgantara Mandala Museum, Sleman Regency, Special Region of Yogyakarta. Painted in Ignatius Dewanto's F-338 livery.
Unknown / F-363 – Abdul Rachman Saleh Airbase, Malang, East Java.

Israel
On display
P-51D
Israeli Defense Force s/n 18 (later, s/n 38) - The Israeli Air Force Museum Collection in Beer Sheva
Israeli Defense Force s/n 41 - The Israeli Air Force Museum Collection in Beer Sheva
P-51K
44-11811 – The Israeli Air Force Museum Collection in Beer Sheva.

Italy
Airworthy
P-51D
44-73864 – private owner in Crocetta del Montello. 
On display
P-51D
44-73444 – Italian Air Force Museum at Vigna di Valle Air Force Base.

Mexico
Airworthy
P-51D
44-72934 – Humberto Lobo in Monterey.

Netherlands
Airworthy
P-51D
44-74425 – 'Damn Yankee' Owner Tom van der Meulen at Oostwold Airport (EHOW).
44-74923 – 'Trusty Rusty' Owner 'Early Birds' foundation Lelystad Airport (EHLE).
On display
P-51K
44-12125 – The Militaire Luchtvaart Museum in Soesterberg.

New Zealand
Airworthy
P-51D
44-13016 – Robert Broek in Wanaka. As of May 2014 this aircraft was for sale.
44-74829 – Graham Bethell, based at Ardmore, Auckland.
On display
P-51D
44-74827 – RNZAF Museum at Wigram Air Force Base.
Under restoration
45-11513 – NZ2423 Brendon Deere/Biggin Hill Historic Aircraft Centre, RNZAF Base Ohakea. Ex John Smith collection, Mapua.

Philippines
On display
P-51D
44-74627 – Basa Air Force Base.
3733/4823 - Philippine Air Force Aerospace Museum.

South Korea
On display
P-51D

44-73494 – Korean War Memorial in Seoul.
44-84669 – Korean War Museum in Seoul.

Sweden
Airworthy
Cavalier Mustang II
44-10753 (adopted serial number, exact identity of a/c is unknown). Former Salvadoran Air Force FAS 405 – Biltema Nordic Services AB. Aircraft based in Ängelholm.
On display
P-51D
44-63992 Swedish Air Force number 26020 – Swedish Air Force Museum, Linköping.
P-51D
44-72112 Swedish Air Force number 26084 – wreckage salvaged from a moor near Vidsel in 1998. Restored and is now on display at Flygmuseet F21, Luleå.

Switzerland
On display
P-51D
44-73349 – Swiss Air Force Museum in Dubendorf.

South Africa
Under restoration
P-51D
44-72202 – SAAF Museum at Swartkop Air Force Base.

Turkey
Airworthy
P-51D
44-13704 Ferocious Frankie – M.S.Ö. Air & Space Museum, Sivrihisar.

United Kingdom
Airworthy
P-51D
44-72035 – Hangar 11 Collection in North Weald, Essex.
44-72216 – Robs Lamplough in Duxford and North Weald.
44-73149 – Old Flying Machine Company in Duxford.
44-73877 – Shaun Patrick, Sharkmouth Ltd., Goodwood.
On display
P-51D
44-14574 – East Essex Aviation Museum in Essex.
44-73979 – The Imperial War Museum in London.
44-74409 Donald – RAF Museum in Hendon.
44-73415p – RAF Museum Cosford.
Under restoration
P-51D
44-13954 – Mustang Restoration Group in Coventry.
44-14291 – Phil G. Earthey.
44-73098 – Aces High Ltd., Duxford.
44-73822 Lil Margaret – privately owned in Bungay, Norfolk.
Other
P-51D
45-11518 – Maurice Hammond in Eye, Suffolk. Airworthy until crashed at Hardwick, Norfolk on October 2, 2016.
44-84847 – Miss Velma, of The Fighter Collection, in Duxford. The aircraft experienced engine problems concluding an exhibit and force-landed short of the Duxford runway in a wheat field. The crew was unharmed; the aircraft received moderate damage. She is currently undergoing repairs to airworthy condition.

United States

Airworthy
CA-17 Mustang 20
A68-1 (painted as 44-15757 Jeannie Too) – privately owned in Troy, Alabama.
A68-39 (painted as 44-14826) – based at Erickson Aircraft Collection in Madras, Oregon.
CA-18 Mustang 21
A68-100 (painted as 44-14777 Flying Dutchman) – privately owned in Snellville, Georgia.
CA-18 Mustang 22
A68-187 (painted as 44-74839 La Pistolera) – based at Lewis Air Legends in San Antonio, Texas.
A68-198 (painted as 45-11483 Short-Fuse-Salle) – privately owned in Ozona, Texas.
CA-18 Mustang 23
A68-175 (painted as 44-74950 Slender Tender Tall) – privately owned in Wilmington, Delaware.
Cavalier Mustang II
67-14866 Bum Steer – privately owned in Houston, Texas.
67-22579 Mormon Mustang – privately owned in Rexburg, Idaho.
67-22580 Six Shooter – privately owned in Ennis, Montana.
67-22581 Lou IV – based at the Mid American Flight Museum in Mount Pleasant, Texas.
P-51A
43-6006 (unnamed) – privately owned in Syracuse, Kansas.
43-6251 Mrs. Virginia – based at Planes of Fame in Chino, California.
P-51B
42-106638 Impatient Virgin – based at Historic Flight Foundation in Spokane, Washington.
43-12252 Old Crow – privately owned (Jack Roush) in Livonia, Michigan.
43-24837 Berlin Express – privately owned in Houston, Texas.
P-51C
42-103645 Tuskegee Airmen – based at Commemorative Air Force (Red Tail Squadron) in South St. Paul, Minnesota.
42-103831 Ina the Macon Belle – based at Fantasy of Flight in Polk City, Florida.
43-24907 Lope's Hope 3rd – based at Dakota Territory Air Museum in Minot, North Dakota.
43-25057 Boise Bee – based at Warhawk Air Museum in Nampa, Idaho.
43-25147 Princess Elizabeth – privately owned in Houston, Texas.
TP-51C
42-103293 Betty Jane – based at Collings Foundation in Stow, Massachusetts.
P-51D
44-10755 Cottonmouth – privately owned in Bridgman, Michigan.
44-11153 Kimberly Kaye – privately owned in Pleasanton, California.
44-12858 Sonny Boy – privately owned in Edmonds, Washington.
44-13105 Strega – privately owned in Bakersfield, California.
44-13250 Ridge Runner III – privately owned in Blaine, Minnesota.
44-13253 Goldfinger – privately owned in Thousand Oaks, California.
44-13257 Slender Tender & Tall – privately owned in Sarasota, Florida.
44-13903 Frances Dell – privately owned in Louisville, Colorado.
44-13521 Marinell – privately owned in Albuquerque, New Mexico.
44-14985 Millie G – privately owned in Tulsa, Oklahoma.
44-63350 Lou IV – privately owned in Wenatchee, Washington.
44-63476 KWITCHERBITCHEN – privately owned in Philadelphia, Pennsylvania.
44-63542 Jacqueline – previously privately owned in Carson City, Nevada. Now based at the American Airpower Museum in Republic Airport, Farmingdale, Long Island, New York since 2018.
44-63576 (unnamed) – privately owned in McMinnville, Oregon.
44-63577 Was That Too Fast – privately owned in Scottsdale, Arizona.
44-63663 Miss Marilyn II – privately owned in San Antonio, Texas.
44-63675 Sierra Sue / Gul Kalle – privately owned in Bloomington, Minnesota.
44-63701 Grim Reaper – privately owned in San Jose, California.
44-63807 Daddy's Girl – privately owned in McClellan, California.
44-63864 Twilight Tear – based at Fagen Fighters WWII Museum in Granite Falls, Minnesota.
44-63865 Tempus Fugit - based at Triple Tree Aerodrome in Woodruff, SC.
44-63893 Glamorous Glen III – privately owned in Reno, Nevada.
44-64122 Kansas City Kitty – privately owned in Jefferson City, Missouri.
44-72051 Sweet Revenge – based at Fagen Fighters WWII Museum in Granite Falls, Minnesota.
44-72145 Petie 3rd – privately owned in Santa Barbara, California.
44-72192 Straw Boss 2 – based at California Warbirds in Hollister, California.
44-72339 The Brat III – based at Cavanaugh Flight Museum in Addison, Texas.
44-72364 Upupa Epops – based at The Flying Heritage Collection in Everett, Washington.
44-72438 Hell-er Bust – privately owned in Boise, Idaho.
44-72483 Double Trouble Two – based at Military Aviation Museum in Pungo, Virginia.
44-72739 Man O War – based at Commemorative Air Force (Southern California Wing) Camarillo, California.
44-72777 Blondie – privately owned in Klamath, California.
44-72907 Red Dog XII – privately owned in Castro Valley, California.
44-72942 Petie 2nd – privately owned in Pewaukee, Wisconsin.
44-73029 Bald Eagle – privately owned in Philadelphia, Pennsylvania.
44-73079 Primo Branco – privately owned in Half Moon Bay, California.
44-73129 Merlin's Magic – privately owned in Danville, California.
44-73140 Petie 2nd – privately owned in New Iberia, Louisiana.
44-73142 E Pluribus Unum – privately owned in Port Orange, Florida.
44-73206 Hurry Home Honey – privately owned in Blowing Rock, North Carolina.
44-73254 Louisiana Kid – privately owned in Onalaska, Texas.

44-73264 Gunfighter – based at Commemorative Air Force (Gunfighter Sponsor Group) in Council Bluffs, Iowa.
44-73275 Never Miss – privately owned in Wilmington, Delaware.
44-73279 Sweet and Lovely – privately owned in Alva, Oklahoma.
44-73287 Worry Bird – based at Air Combat Museum in Springfield, Illinois.
44-73343 Live Bait – based at Lewis Air Legends in  Houston, Texas.
44-73415 VooDoo – based at Planes of Fame in Chino, California.
44-73420 (unnamed) – based at Allied Fighters in Sun Valley, Idaho.
44-73436 American Beauty – based at Olympic Flight Museum in Olympia, Washington.
44-73454 This Is It – privately owned in New Castle, Delaware.
44-73543 Sweetie Face – privately owned in North Fort Myers, Florida.
44-73656 Moonbeam McSwine – based at Warbird Heritage Foundation in Waukegan, Illinois
44-73704 Weaver's Nude – privately owned in Los Altos, California.
44-73751 Miss Kandy – privately owned in Los Angeles, California.
44-73843 Old Red Nose – based at Commemorative Air Force (Dixie Wing) in Peachtree City, Georgia.
44-73856 Double Trouble Two – privately owned in Houston, Texas.
44-73990 Alabama Rammer Jammer – privately owned in Geiger, Alabama.
44-74008 Comfortably Numb – privately owned in Lodi, California.
44-74009 Ain't Missbehavin – privately owned in Shoal Creek, Alabama.
44-74012 (unnamed) – based at Stonehenge Air Museum in Lincoln County, Montana.
44-74202 Swamp Fox – privately owned in Concord, North Carolina.
44-74230 Gentleman Jim – privately owned (Jack Roush) in Livonia, Michigan.
44-74389 Speedball Alice – privately owned in Sebastopol, California.
44-74391 The Hun Hunter/Texas – privately owned in Houston, Texas.
44-74404 Dazzling Donna – privately owned in Kindred, North Dakota.
44-74423 Miss Van Nuys – privately owned in Los Angeles, California.
44-74458 Sizzlin' Liz – privately owned in Jacksonville, Florida.
44-74466 Barbara Jean – privately owned in Raymond, Nebraska.
44-74483 (unnamed) – privately owned in Vineburg, California.
44-74494 Mustang Sally – privately owned in Onalaska, Texas.
44-74497 Little Witch – privately owned in Kissimmee, Florida.
44-74502 Crazy Horse 2 – privately owned in Kissimmee, Florida.
44-74506 Lady B – privately owned in Port Orange, Florida.
44-74524 Dakota Kid/Long Island Kid – based at Dakota Territory Air Museum in Minot, North Dakota.
44-74536 Miss America – based at Oklahoma Museum of Flying in Oklahoma City, Oklahoma.
44-74582 Crusader – privately owned in Denver, Colorado.
44-74602 (unnamed) – privately owned in Ione, California.
44-74739 Ole Yeller – based at Legacy of Flight Museum in Rexburg, Idaho.
44-74774 Old Crow – privately owned in Wilmington, Delaware.
44-74832 Boomer – based at Fargo Air Museum in Fargo, North Dakota.
44-74865 My Sweet Mary Lou – privately owned in Provo, Utah.
44-74813 Cripes a Mighty – privately owned in Coshocton, Ohio.
44-74878 (unnamed) – privately owned in Indianapolis, Indiana.
44-74908 Bunny – based at Palm Springs Air Museum in Palm Springs, California.
44-74976 Obsession – privately owned in Port Orange, Florida.
44-74977 Charlotte's Chariot II – privately owned in Helena, Montana.
44-74996 Dago Red – privately owned in Kerman, California.
44-75009 Rosalie – privately owned in Carson City, Nevada.
44-75452 Happy Jack's Go Buggy – privately owned in San Antonio, Texas.
44-84390 Section Eight – privately owned in Aberdeen, Idaho.
44-84410 Cincinnati Miss – based at Tri-State Warbird Museum in Batavia, Ohio.
44-84615 Blood Brother – privately owned in Sidney, Montana.
44-84655 Toulouse Nuts – based at the Collings Foundation in Stow, Massachusetts.This aircraft has two seats.
44-84658 The Friendly Ghost – based at War Eagles Air Museum in Santa Teresa, New Mexico.
44-84745 Crazy Horse – privately owned in Nashua, New Hampshire.
44-84753 Buzzin Cuzzin – privately owned in Holderness, New Hampshire.
44-84860 Lady Jo – privately owned in Cloverdale, California.
44-84864 (unnamed) – privately owned in Hayward, California.
44-84900 NACA 127 – privately owned in Las Vegas, Nevada.
44-84933 The Rebel – privately owned in Wellington, Florida.
44-84952 Sarah Jean – privately owned in Wilmington, Delaware.
44-84961 Wee Willy II – based at Planes of Fame in Chino, California.
45-11367 Angels Playmate – privately owned in Cheraw, South Carolina.
45-11391 Boo Man Choo – privately owned in Wilmington, Delaware.
45-11439 Quicksilver – privately owned in Maxwelton, West Virginia.
45-11471 Diamondback – privately owned in Boise, Idaho.
45-11495 Little Rebel – privately owned in Alva, Oklahoma.
45-11507 Cripes a Mighty 3rd – based at Fantasy of Flight in Polk City, Florida.
45-11525 Val Halla – based at Heritage Flight Museum in Eastsound, Washington.
45-11553 Shangri-La – privately owned in Montgomery, Texas.
45-11558 (unnamed) – privately owned in Los Angeles, California.
45-11559 Mad Max – privately owned in Little Falls, New Jersey.
45-11582 Dolly – based at Planes of Fame in Chino, California.
45-11586 Little Horse – based at Dakota Territory Air Museum in Minot, North Dakota.
45-11628 Ho Hun – privately owned in Mesa, Arizona.
45-11633 Lady Alice – privately owned in Wilmington, Delaware.
45-11636 Stang Evil – privately owned in Lakewood, Colorado.
P-51H
44-64314 (unnamed) – privately owned in Alamo, California.
P-51K
44-12016 Fragile but Agile – privately owned in Houston, Texas.
44-12840 Kiss Me Kate – privately owned by Valhalla Aviation Inc. in Los Angeles, California.
44-12852 Frenesi – privately owned in Houston, Texas.

On display
Cavalier Mustang II
68-15795 – Minnesota Air National Guard Museum in Minneapolis, Minnesota.
XP-51
41-038 Original XP-51 – EAA AirVenture Museum in Oshkosh, Wisconsin.
P-51A
43-6274 (unnamed) – Yanks Air Museum in Chino, California.
P-51C
44-10947 Excalibur III – Steven F. Udvar-Hazy Center of the National Air and Space Museum in Chantilly, Virginia.
P-51D

serial number unknown Bunnie/Miss Kentucky State – National World War II Museum in New Orleans, Louisiana.
serial number unknown Feeble Eagle – Museum of Flight in Seattle, Washington.
serial number unknown – South Carolina Air National Guard Memorial Park, McEntire Air National Guard Station, South Carolina.
assembled from multiple P-51 hulks/multiple serial numbers; marked as 44-13371 Audrey – Hill Aerospace Museum, Hill AFB, Utah.
44-13571 No unique name; painted as post-WW II Eglin Field armament evaluation aircraft- Air Force Armament Museum at Eglin AFB, Florida.
44-63272 Bad Angel – Pima Air & Space Museum, adjacent to Davis-Monthan AFB, Tucson, Arizona.
44-63615 Bunnie – Seymour Johnson AFB, North Carolina.
44-72948 Wham Bam – Charleston ANGB, West Virginia.
44-72989 (unnamed) – Volk Field ANGB, Wisconsin.
44-73683 Bunnie – San Diego Aerospace Museum in San Diego, California.
44-73972 (unnamed) – Fresno ANGB in Fresno, California.
44-74216 Derailer – Battleship Memorial Park in Mobile, Alabama.
44-74407 (unnamed) – Fargo ANGB/Hector Field in Fargo, North Dakota.
44-74910 Miss Judy – Yanks Air Museum in Chino, California.
44-74936 Shimmy IV – National Museum of the United States Air Force at Wright-Patterson AFB in Dayton, Ohio.
44-74939 Willit Run? – National Air and Space Museum in Washington, DC.
44-75007 Paul I – EAA AirVenture Museum in Oshkosh, Wisconsin.
P-51H
44-64265 Louisiana Heatwave – Museum of Aviation, Robins Air Force Base in Warner Robins, Georgia.  Formerly on display at Octave Chanute Aerospace Museum at the former Chanute AFB in Rantoul, Illinois.
44-64376 (unnamed) – Lackland AFB in Texas.
P-51K
44-12116 Second Fiddle – Crawford Auto-Aviation Museum in Cleveland, Ohio.

Under restoration or in storage
P-51A
43-6178 – in storage at Fantasy of Flight in Polk City, Florida.
P-51C
42-103740 – to airworthiness by The Oklahoma Museum of Flying in Oklahoma City, Oklahoma.
P-51D
44-63762 – to airworthiness by private owner in Camden, Delaware.
44-63791 – to airworthiness by private owner in Pensacola, Florida.
44-63889 Queen of Hearts – to airworthiness by private owner in Onalaska, Texas.
44-72028 – to airworthiness by private owner in Camden, Delaware.
44-72059 – to airworthiness by private owner in Wilmington, Delaware.
44-72395 – to airworthiness by private owner in Camden, Delaware.
44-72400 – for static display by New England Air Museum in Windsor Locks, Connecticut.
44-72902 American Dreamer – in storage by private owner in West Hollywood, California.
44-72936 – to airworthiness by private owner in Encino, California.
44-72990 (unnamed) – in storage at US Army Aviation Museum at Fort Rucker, Alabama.
44-73081 – in storage by private owner in Hayward, California.
44-73163 – to airworthiness by private owner in Hot Springs, North Carolina.
44-73323 – to airworthiness by private owner in Encino, California.
44-73350 Archie – in storage by private owner in Belle, Missouri.
44-73437 – to airworthiness by private owner in Dover, Delaware.
44-73518 Precious Metal – to airworthiness by private owner in Hollywood, Florida.
44-74311 RCAF 9577 – in storage by private owner in San Martin, California.
44-74469 Red Dog – in storage by private owner in Chandler, Arizona.
44-74543 Geraldine – to airworthiness by private owner in Sierra Madre, California.
44-74960 – to airworthiness by private owner in Valparaiso, Indiana.
44-75024 – to airworthiness by War Eagles Air Museum in Santa Teresa, New Mexico.
44-77902 – in storage by private owner in Big Spring, Texas.
44-84850 Su Su – to airworthiness by private owner in La Mesa, California.
44-84896 – to airworthiness by private owner in Pensacola, Florida.
44-84962 – in storage by private owner in New Athens, Illinois.
45-11571 – in storage by private owner in Bandon, Oregon.
P-51H
44-64375 – to airworthiness by private owner in Blaine, Minnesota.
P-51K
44-11807 – to airworthiness by private owner in Fargo, North Dakota.
44-12118 – to airworthiness by private owner in Bemidji, Minnesota.
44-12140 – in storage by private owner in San Diego, California.

Venezuela
On display
P-51D
45-11458 – Museo Aeronauticoat Maracay Air Force Base.

References

External links

North American P-51 Mustangs
Survivors